Democratic Change is a center-left political party in El Salvador. It was formed by former members of the Christian Democratic Party (PDC), Farabundo Marti National Liberation Front (FMLN), and United Democratic Center (CDU). It is a social christian and social democratic in ideological orientation, incorporating what the party calls the "democratic left."

In the 12 March 2006 legislative election, the party won 3.1% of the popular vote and 2 out of 84 seats.

At the January 18, 2009 legislative elections, Democratic Change won 2.1% of the vote and 1 seat.

The party was controversially dissolved by the Supreme Electoral Tribunal (TSE) in July 2018 for failing to meet minimum seat and vote requirements in the 2015 Salvadoran legislative election, despite meeting those requirements in the following 2018 election. As of October 2019, the party has acquired the necessary signatures to be reregistered, and has begun the process with the TSE.

Electoral history

Presidential elections

Legislative Assembly elections

References

External links
Official web site of the party

Political parties in El Salvador
Social democratic parties in North America